Indiana Bell Building is a historic commercial building located in downtown Evansville, Indiana. It was designed by the architectural firm Vonnegut, Bohn, & Mueller and built in 1929 for Indiana Bell.  It is a seven-story, Art Deco style limestone clad building.

It was listed on the National Register of Historic Places in 1982.

It is not to be confused with Indiana Bell's headquarters building in Indianapolis.

References

Commercial buildings on the National Register of Historic Places in Indiana
Art Deco architecture in Indiana
Commercial buildings completed in 1929
Buildings and structures in Evansville, Indiana
National Register of Historic Places in Evansville, Indiana
1929 establishments in Indiana